Hololeion is a genus of East Asian flowering plants in the family Asteraceae. It is native to Japan, Korea, China, and the Russian Far East.

 Species
 Hololeion fauriei (H.Lév. & Vaniot) Kitam. - South Korea
 Hololeion krameri Kitam. - Honshu, Kyushu 
 Hololeion maximowiczii Kitam. - Korea, Kyushu, Amur, Khabarovsk, Primorye, Heilongjiang, Jiangsu, Jilin, Liaoning, Inner Mongolia, Zhejiang

References

Asteraceae genera
Flora of China
Flora of Eastern Asia
Flora of the Russian Far East
Cichorieae